Nyota, The Peacemaker is a series of comic booklets created by the Kenyan artist - peace activist Marcel Musyoki (1978) who wrote under the pen name of Marcel Bin. The series is one of the most popular African comics in Kenya, with translations published in more than 5 local languages (A part from English, the official language in Kenya and Swahili, the national language respectively) and more than 200,000 copies of the booklets distributed to schools, village libraries, etc. to date. Its popularity around Kenya in particular and Africa in general has been attributed to its unique approach to promote the idea of peace both educationally and entertaining.

The first series appeared in Swahili in January 2009 in Kenya.

The heroine of the series is Nyota (Swahili for star), a young African peace maker. She is aided in her adventures in quest for peace by her faithful messenger bird Chaku.

References 

2008 comics debuts
Comics set in Africa
Comics about women
Female characters in comics
Superhero comics